Serravalle (Italian, meaning "place where the valley narrows", and less often meaning "a fortification") may refer to:

Italy

Municipalities 
 Serravalle a Po, in the province of Mantua 
 Serravalle di Chienti, in the province of Macerata 
 Serravalle Langhe, in the province of Cuneo 
 Serravalle Pistoiese, in the province of Pistoia; the commune also includes the frazioni of Serravalle Scalo and Ponte di Serravalle
 Serravalle Scrivia, in the province of Alessandria 
 Serravalle Sesia, in the province of Vercelli 
 Castello di Serravalle, a frazione of Valsamoggia in the Metropolitan City of Bologna

Other places 
 Serravalle (Vittorio Veneto), a district of Vittorio Veneto
 Serravalle, a small settlement in the commune of Ala, Trentino
 Serravalle, a small settlement in the commune of Asti, Piedmont
 Serravalle, a small settlement in the commune of Berra,  Emilia-Romagna
 Serravalle, a small settlement in the commune of Bibbiena, Tuscany
 Serravalle, Buonconvento, a small settlement in the commune of Buonconvento, Tuscany
 Serravalle, a small settlement in the commune of Filattiera, Tuscany 
 Serravalle, a small settlement in the commune of Norcia, Umbria
 Serravalle, a small settlement in the commune of Ortonovo, Liguria
 Serravalle, a small settlement in the commune of Piasco, Piedmont 
 Serravalle, a small settlement in the commune of Varano de' Melegari, Emilia-Romagna
 Casali di Serravalle, a small settlement in the commune of Norcia, Umbria
 Serravalle di Carda, a small settlement in the commune of Apecchio, Marche
 Valdara di Serravalle, a small settlement in the commune of Apecchio, Marche
 Castle of Serravalle, a medieval castle in Bosa, Sardinia

San Marino 
 Serravalle (San Marino), a sanmarinese castello

Switzerland 
 Serravalle, Switzerland, a municipality in the canton of Ticino

People with the surname
 Giovanni da Serravalle (1350–1445), Italian Franciscan and humanist
 Daniel Serravalle de Sá (1974–), Brazilian professor